Yakutsk is the capital city of Sakha, Russia, located about  south of the Arctic Circle. Fueled by the mining industry, Yakutsk has become one of Russia's most rapidly growing regional cities, with a population of 355,443 at the 2021 Census.

Yakutsk is also the largest city located in continuous permafrost; the only other large city is Norilsk, also in Siberia. Yakutsk is located in the Central Yakutian Lowland and is a major port on the Lena River. It is served by the Yakutsk Airport as well as the smaller Magan Airport.

Etymology
The city was founded in 1632 by the Cossacks and was originally called either the Lensky fortress or the Yakutsk fortress. The first version of the toponym came from the hydronym "Lena", the second, from "Yakutia", eventually became the main one in use. In 1708 it received city status as Yakutsk.

History

The Yakuts, also known as the Sakha people, migrated to the area during the 13th and 14th centuries from other parts of Siberia. When they arrived they mixed with other indigenous Siberians in the area. The Russian settlement of Yakutsk was founded in 1632 as an ostrog (fortress) by Pyotr Beketov.

In 1639, it became the center of the Voivode of Yakutsk, who became the most important Russian official in the region and directed expansion to the east and south.

Climate

With an intensely continental subarctic climate (Köppen climate classification Dfd), Yakutsk has the coldest winter temperatures for any city its size or larger on Earth. Yakutsk is the largest city built on continuous permafrost, and many houses there are built on concrete piles.

The lowest temperatures ever recorded on the planet outside Antarctica have occurred in the basin of the Yana River to the northeast of Yakutsk. Yakutsk is the largest city in the world with an average winter temperature of below . 

Yakutsk is an inland location, being almost  from the Pacific Ocean, which coupled with the high latitude means exposure to severe winters and also lack of temperature moderation. July temperatures soar to an above-normal average for this latitude, with the average being several degrees hotter than more southerly Far East cities such as Vladivostok or Yuzhno-Sakhalinsk. The July daytime temperatures are even hotter than some maritime subtropical areas. The warm summers ensure that Yakutsk, despite its freezing winters, is far south of the tree line.

The climate is quite dry, with most of the annual precipitation occurring in the summer months, due to the intense Siberian High forming around the very cold continental air during the winter. However, summer precipitation is not heavy since the moist southeasterly winds from the Pacific Ocean lose their moisture over the coastal mountains well before reaching the Lena Valley.

Economy

The primary economic activity stems from mining activities in the region, particularly coal, gold, and diamonds, with multiple mining companies having set up their headquarters in the city. Precious stones and metals, particularly diamonds, as well as coal, are Yakutia's major exports. The export volume was $5.55 billion in 2021, making it the 16th largest out of eighty-five of Russia's federal subjects, although it contracted sharply (under $1 billion) in 2022. Major imports are machinery, electronics, and appliances. In 2021, the import volume was $180 million, making it the 64th largest importer out of eighty-five federal subjects of Russia. Most of the imports come from the United States and China.

Yakutsk Airport is the main airport, and Yakutia Airlines has its head office in the city.

Tourism as economic sector plays a small but growing role, thanks to the city's unique cultural heritage and natural attractions such as the Lena Pillars Nature Park, a UNESCO World Heritage site, and the Permafrost Kingdom, which is a tourist complex dedicated to showcasing the unique features of the region's permafrost. With the Lena River navigable in the summer, there are boat cruises offered, including upriver to the Lena Pillars, and downriver tours which visit spectacular scenery in the lower reaches and the Lena Delta.

In recent years, housing construction, with an emphasis on providing affordable housing, has been a focus, which was accompanied by the growth in the construction materials manufacturing.

A sizeable portion of the republic's agricultural sector is located in Yakutsk, which accounts for 89% of the republic's meat and 34% of the republic's dairy production. Yakutsk has also been developing its service sector, with a focus on financial services, retail, and hospitality. The city has several shopping centers and a growing number of hotels and restaurants catering to both tourists and locals.

Culture

There are several theaters in Yakutsk: the State Russian Drama Theater, named after A. S. Pushkin; the Sakha Theater, named after P. A. Oiyunsky; the Suorun Omoloon Young Spectator's Theater; and the State Academic Opera and Ballet Theater, named after D. K. Sivtsev.

Museums include the National Fine Arts Museum of Sakha; the Museum of Local Lore and History, named after E. Yaroslavsky; and the only museums in the world dedicated to the khomus and permafrost.

The annual Ysyakh summer festival takes place the last weekend in June. The traditional Yakut summer solstice festivities include a celebration of the revival and renewal of the nature, fertility and beginning of a new year. It is accompanied by national Yakut rituals and ceremonies, folk dancing, horse racing, Yakut ethnic music and singing, national cuisine, and competitions in traditional Yakut sports.

There is a local punk scene in Yakutsk, with many bands.

The city has an increasingly vibrant film industry that has been gaining international recognition over recent years for its unique style and the way its filmmakers portray the region and its people. The regional film industry has come to be nicknamed "Sakhawood".

People in Yakutsk wear very fluffy and fuzzy clothing, and to cope with extremely cold weather they shelter indoors in warm housing, which is believed to reduce their increase in winter mortality rates compared to winter in milder regions of the world.

Demographics

According to the results of the 2021 Census, the population of Yakutsk was 355,443 in the city proper and 372,928 in the city's urban area, which is one third of the total population of Sakha.

In the 2010 Census, the following ethnic groups were listed:

Administrative and municipal status
Yakutsk is the capital of the Sakha Republic. As an inhabited locality, Yakutsk is classified as a city under republic jurisdiction. Within the framework of administrative divisions, it is, together with the settlement of Zhatay and eleven rural localities, incorporated as the city of republic significance of Yakutsk—an administrative unit with a status equal to that of the districts. As a municipal division, Yakutsk and the eleven rural localities are incorporated as Yakutsk Urban Okrug. The settlement of Zhatay is not a part of Yakutsk Urban Okrug and is independently incorporated as Zhatay Urban Okrug.

Divisional source:

*Administrative centers are shown in bold

Transportation

Yakutsk is a destination of the Lena Highway. The city's connection to that highway is only usable by ferry in the summer, or in the dead of winter, by driving directly over the frozen Lena River, since Yakutsk lies entirely on its western bank, and there is no bridge anywhere in the Sakha Republic that crosses the Lena. In the dead of winter, the frozen Lena River makes for a passable highway for ice truckers using its channel to deliver provisions to far-flung outposts. The river is impassable for long periods of the year when it contains loose ice, when the ice cover is not thick enough to support traffic, or when the water level is too high and the river is turbulent with spring flooding. The highway ends on the eastern bank of Lena in Nizhny Bestyakh (Нижний Бестях), an urban-type settlement of some four thousand people. Nizhny Bestyakh is connected with Magadan by the Kolyma Highway.

Construction of a highway bridge over the River Lena to Yakutsk was approved by president Vladimir Putin on 9 November 2019. The cost of the bridge and its  of approaches was estimated at 63.7 billion Rubles (83 billion rubles including VAT [НДС]), of which a grant of 54.2 billion Rubles was to be provided, with the remainder to be sourced from investors. The bridge was to be toll-free for cars, with a toll for trucks. As of summer 2022, work has yet to begin on the project.

The bridge had originally been planned to be a dual-use railroad and highway bridge so the Amur Yakutsk Mainline, the North–South railroad being extended from the south, could connect the city with the East–West Baikal Amur Mainline. The railroad reached the settlement of Nizhny Bestyakh, on the opposite bank of the Lena from Yakutsk, in November 2011.

The 2019 completion of a new rail line to the eastern bank of the Lena permitted the start of passenger rail services between Yakutsk and the rest of Russia.

Yakutsk is also connected to other parts of Russia by Yakutsk Airport.

Education and research
M.K.Ammosov North-Eastern Federal University is situated in the city. There is also a branch of the Russian Academy of Sciences, which contains, among other things, the Institute of Cosmophysical Research, which runs the Yakutsk Extensive Air Shower installation (one of the largest cosmic-ray detector arrays in the world), and the Melnikov Permafrost Institute, founded in 1960 with the aim of solving the serious and costly problems associated with construction of buildings on frozen soil. In 2020, with global heating thawing the ground, the institute is measuring the rate at which the permafrost is thawing, which affects the city as well as the climate.

At the primary and secondary levels, the city has a number of UNESCO Associated Schools, including the Sakha-Turkish College, Sakha-French School, Sakha-Korean School, and School #16.

Twin towns – sister cities

Yakutsk is twinned with:

 Fairbanks, United States
 Harbin, China
 Heihe, China
 Murayama, Japan
 Olympia, Greece
 Velingrad, Bulgaria

See also

Yakutsk TV Tower

References

Bibliography

External links

Official website of Yakutsk 
Sakha Life Information Agency 
Lena Pillars at Natural Heritage Protection Fund
Flickr photos tagged Yakutsk
 The State Yakutia United Museum of History and Culture of the People of the North at Google Cultural Institute

 
Russian Far East
Populated places established in 1632
1632 establishments in Russia
Populated places on the Lena River
Central Yakutian Lowland